Lucas Ramón Pugh (born 1 January 1994) is an Argentine footballer who plays as a forward for Ferro Carril Oeste.

Pugh had played for Argentina national U-17 team at the 2011 FIFA U-17 World Cup, where he scored 1 goal against Jamaica national U-17 team.

References

External links 
 
 
 

Living people
1994 births
Argentine footballers
Argentine expatriate footballers
Club Atlético River Plate footballers
Arsenal de Sarandí footballers
C.F. Os Belenenses players
Club y Biblioteca Ramón Santamarina footballers
UiTM FC players
Ferro Carril Oeste footballers
Primera Nacional players
Argentine Primera División players
Argentine expatriate sportspeople in Malaysia
Association football forwards
Sportspeople from Santa Fe Province